Alan Christie Stedman (23 April 1908 – 1 July 1984) was a New Zealand tennis player.

Biography
Born in Palmerston North, Stedman was New Zealand's 1930 national singles champion.

Stedman, credited with a strong forehand, competed on tour through the 1930s. On his Wimbledon debut in 1933 he came from two sets down to win his first round match over John Olliff, later losing to Jack Crawford in the fourth round. He made the fourth round again in 1937 and lost in five sets to Bryan Grant. As a doubles player he twice reached the Wimbledon quarter-finals. His career titles included the 1935 Irish Championships, where he beat his countryman Cam Malfroy in the final. He played Davis Cup for New Zealand between 1934 and 1937.

In World War II he served as a Second Lieutenant in the army and fought in the Western Desert campaign. He was a German prisoner of war for four years. After the war he worked as an accountant.

See also
List of New Zealand Davis Cup team representatives

References

External links
 
 
 

1908 births
1984 deaths
New Zealand male tennis players
Sportspeople from Palmerston North
New Zealand military personnel of World War II
World War II prisoners of war held by Germany
New Zealand prisoners of war in World War II